Velayudhan Govindan (date of birth unknown, died 8 March 2015) was an Indian cricketer. He played fifteen first-class matches for Kerala between 1957 and 1967.

References

External links
 

Year of birth missing
2015 deaths
Indian cricketers
Kerala cricketers
Cricketers from Thrissur